The Bovespa Index, best known as Ibovespa is the benchmark index of about 92 stocks traded on the B3 (Brasil Bolsa Balcão), accounting for the majority of trading and market capitalization in the Brazilian stock market. It is weighted measurement index.

Overview 

The index is a total return index composed by a theoretical portfolio as follows:
Selection criteria: Being amongst the eligible stocks that account for 85% in descending order by individual tradability ratio (IN); Traded in 95% of the trading sessions; 0.1% of the value traded on the cash equity market (round lots); and must not be a penny stock. It is weighted by free float.

It is revised on a 4-month portfolio cycle in January, May, and September. On average, the components of Ibovespa represent 70% of all the stock value traded.

Its index number represents the present value of a portfolio begun on 2 January 1968, with a starting value of 100 and taking into account share price increases plus the reinvestment of all dividends, subscription rights that the constant's bonus stocks received.

History and adjustments
Prior to 2014 the index was composed by a theoretical portfolio with the stocks that accounted for 80% of the volume traded in the last 12 months and that were traded at least on 80% of the trading days. It was revised quarterly, in order to keep its representativeness of the volume traded and in average the components of Ibovespa represented 70% of all the stock value traded. On September 11, 2013, BM&FBOVESPA announced the changes to the Ibovespa methodology, which would be implemented in a two-phased approach by May 2014.

The principal changes to the index methodology included:
 Weighting function – previously a liquidity-driven weighting, starting from January 2014, weighting is now based on market value attributable to a constituent’s free float, with a liquidity cap (Tradability Ratio) set at twice the hypothetical weight of the constituent
 The Tradability Ratio (Índice de Negociabilidade, or IN) is now calculated to take into account 1/3 of a component’s share of the overall number of trades and 2/3 of the component’s share of the overall value traded on the cash equity market;
 The Tradability Ratio cut-off threshold for a stock to qualify for inclusion in the index has been raised from 80% to 85%
 The ‘active trading’ requirement, as measured based on number of trading sessions, has been raised from 80% to 95%
 In flotations of issuers listed over the course of the two previous portfolio cycles, the new stocks are now accepted for early index membership
 Stocks that qualify as penny stocks are now ineligible for inclusion in the index
 Stocks which at any rebalancing classify by individual Tradability Ratio over a certain period, collectively account for over ninety percent (90%) of the sum total of such metric, are now removed from the index
 The criteria pursuant to which a constituent stock which is suspended from trading retains index membership or is removed from the index have been made clear
 A limit was introduced in terms of the maximum relative weight of a company’s total contribution to the index.

Adjustments
The index has been adjusted as follows, most of the adjustments occurred during the time Brazil experienced high rates of inflation during the 1980s and early 1990s:

division by 100, on 3 October 1983
division by 10, on 2 December 1985
division by 10, on 29 August 1988
division by 10, on 14 April 1989
division by 10, on 12 January 1990
division by 10, on 28 May 1991
division by 10, on 21 January 1992
division by 10, on 26 January 1993
division by 10, on 27 August 1993
division by 10, on 10 February 1994
division by 10, on 3 March 1997

Record values

Annual returns 
The following table shows the annual development of the Índice Bovespa since 1998.

For a list of the components of the index, check the article List of companies listed on Ibovespa.

See also
 B3
 List of companies listed on Ibovespa
 Share Price of Índice Bovespa

References

External links
Bloomberg page for IBOV:IND
Bovespa Index 
Summary for BR-SP BOVESPA IND - Yahoo! Finance
Top Companies in Brazil
Companies Composition Ibovespa

Bovespa